Ian Fuller (born August 31, 1979) is an American former soccer player who currently serves as an assistant coach for Minnesota United FC.

Career

Youth and college
Fuller grew up in Tualatin, Oregon, and attended Tualatin High School where he was a three-time first team All State soccer player. He then played college soccer at Clemson University from 1998 to 2001.

Professional
Fuller was drafted in the second round (21st overall) of the 2002 MLS SuperDraft by New England Revolution. He played eleven regular season and three playoff games before being waived on November 4, 2002. In February 2003, he signed with the Rochester Rhinos of the USL First Division. Fuller spent the 2003 and 2004 seasons in Rochester, and played the first two games of the 2005 season, before moving to the Vancouver Whitecaps. In 2006, Fuller signed with the Charleston Battery. After four years with the club he moved to USSF Division 2 club Austin Aztex. With the sale and movement of the Austin Aztex to Orlando following the end of the 2010 season, Ian was retained by the club, becoming a member of Orlando City in January 2011.

Coaching
Beginning in 2010 Fuller also began working as assistant coach for the Charleston Battery of the USL Second Division (USL-2). He would continue his coaching career as a player-coach and assistant for Orlando City S.C. in 2011. In September 2013, Fuller retired as a player to become a full-time assistant for Orlando City.

Honors

Charleston Battery
 USL Second Division Champions: 2010
 USL Second Division Regular Season Champions: 2010

Orlando City
USL Pro: 2011; 2013

References

External links
 Charleston Battery bio

1979 births
Living people
American soccer players
Soccer players from Portland, Oregon
Austin Aztex FC players
Charleston Battery players
Clemson Tigers men's soccer players
Major League Soccer players
New England Revolution players
Orlando City SC (2010–2014) players
People from Tualatin, Oregon
Rochester New York FC players
A-League (1995–2004) players
USL First Division players
USL Second Division players
USSF Division 2 Professional League players
USL Championship players
Vancouver Whitecaps (1986–2010) players
People from Porterville, California
New England Revolution draft picks
Orlando City SC non-playing staff
Minnesota United FC non-playing staff
Association football forwards
People from Ellensburg, Washington